Arthrobacter pokkalii is a bacterium from the genus Arthrobacter which has been isolated from the rhizosphere of pokkali rice from Kerala, India. Arthrobacter pokkalii has  beneficial properties for plants.

References 

Micrococcaceae
Bacteria described in 2017